Kaskinen is a town, municipality and island of Finland. It is located in the province of Western Finland and is part of the Ostrobothnia region. The population is bilingual with a majority speaking Finnish and the minority Swedish.

Kaskinen is the smallest municipality in Finland with town status. The town is located on an island with two bridges to the mainland, and its only border neighbor is the town of Närpes. The townscape of Kaskinen consists of uniform wooden construction. Today, however, the railway is only used for freight traffic, mainly for the Port of Kaskinen.

The paddle appearing in the coat of arms of Kaskinen describes the excellent natural harbor that has influenced the establishment of the town in its place. The laurel leaf may have been intended to refer to flowering, but its origin may also be in the name of the Bladh family (Swedish: blad, "leaf"); Two members of the family – father and son – acquired both city rights and township status for the village at that time. The coat of arms has been redrawn by A. W. Rancken (1880–1954) based on the old coat of arms, which was originally confirmed on 9 April 1793.

Etymology
The older name forms of Kaskinen island found in the documents are Kaskisöyen (1546), Casköö (1553), Kaskisöö (1573) and the later Kaskin or Kyperäsaari (1844). Although the oldest known written mention of the name Kaskinen for the town dates back to 1863, the name in Finnish is original. This is also indicated by the fact that in old Swedish island names, the body of the name is Kaskis-, to which the explanatory ending -ö has been added, which means island in Swedish. The most likely interpretation of the island's original name is Kaskisaari ("Slash-burn island"), because the Slash-and-burn agriculture has therefore been practiced on the island in the early days.

History
The town was founded in 1785 on an island by King Gustav III of Sweden and since then it has been one of the most important harbours of Finland. In the 18th century, a town plan with long, straight and wide streets was drawn up for the town, and the plan prepared for a clearly larger population; however, even today, there are still many undeveloped estates in the town, and the urban settlement hardly extends beyond the original zoned area.

The rise of the new town was slow in the 19th century, primarily due to poor transport connections. The bridge to the mainland was completed in 1828. As a maritime town, Kaskinen fell behind Kristinestad and Vaasa. Until the 19th century, fishing and trading were the most important livelihoods. During the heyday of the Finnish sailing fleet on both sides of the middle of the 19th century, especially tar and timber were exported from Kaskinen. The town's merchant fleet was at its largest the size of 12 sailing ships. After the era of sailing ships, coastal traffic as well as freight and passenger traffic to Sweden was practiced in the town by steamships.

On 18 November 2019, Kaskinen and Närpes voted for a municipal merger, but Kaskinen's town council voted 9-8 to reject the consolidation.

Economy
In 2015, there were 479 jobs in the municipality. 5,2% of them were in primary production (agriculture, forestry and fisheries), 39,7% in processing and 53,7% in services. The share of processing was higher than in the whole country (20%). In 2016, the companies that paid the most corporate tax were Oy Sonnfish Ab, Kuivaniemen Kala Oy and Kaskitek Oy.

The town includes the Port of Kaskinen, which deals with cargo transport.

Demographics
The following diagram shows the population development of the town every five years since 1990:

Government

At the end of 2017, Minna Nikander was elected the town manager of Kaskinen.

Politics
The two major parties in Kaskinen are SFP and SDP, which form the majority in elections and in the council. Below are the percentages of support for the parliamentary elections based on the votes cast in the most recent municipal elections:

Swedish People's Party 28.8%
Social Democratic Party 27.0%
True Finns 21.4%
National Coalition Party 12.9%
Left Alliance 6.7%
Green League 3.0%

Culture

Food
Gubbe ronka or gubbe runka, mashed potato containing salted Baltic herring, served with mashed lingonberry and melted butter, was named as Kaskinen's traditional parish dish in the 1980s.

Notable people
 Rosina Heikel (1842–1929), medical doctor and feminist
 Krista Siegfrids (born 1985), pop singer

Gallery

See also
 Närpes
 Kristinestad

References

External links

 Town of Kaskinen – Official website
 BBLogistics OY – Official website, operates in Kaskinen Port since 1991
 Map of Kaskinen

Cities and towns in Finland
Finnish islands in the Baltic
Grand Duchy of Finland
Municipalities of Ostrobothnia (region)
Populated coastal places in Finland
Populated places established in 1785
Port cities and towns in Finland